Miss Ecuador 2022 is the 72nd edition of the Miss Ecuador pageant. The contest will be held on September 3, 2022, in Quevedo, Los Ríos. Susy Sacoto from Manabí crowned her successor Nayelhi González of Esmeraldas in the end of the event. She will represent Ecuador at Miss Universe 2022, and the first Runner-up Georgette Kalil of Guayas will compete at Miss International 2023.

Results

Final Results

Special awards

Best National Costume

Contestants
There are 18 official delegates to compete at Miss Ecuador 2022:

Notes

Returns

Last competed in 2014

Last competed in 2017

Last competed in 2019

Last competed in 2020

Withdrawals

Did not compete - Antonella Ontaneda''' - Daphne Luna

Crossover
Landy Párraga was Virreina de Quevedo 2019 (1st Runner-up).
Mazly Yuqui compoeted at Miss Earth Ecuador 2017, but she did not place. Also, she was Reina de Bucay 2013 and competed at Reina del Guayas 2014 where she was unplaced.
Cristina Zambreno was Virreina de Quevedo 2018 (1st Runner-up).

References

External links
Official Miss Ecuador website

2022 beauty pageants
Beauty pageants in Ecuador
Miss Ecuador